Ribeirão do Tempo (English: Stream of Time; International title: River of Intrigues) is a Brazilian telenovela created by Marcílio Moraes, it is produced and aired by RecordTV from May 18, 2010 to May 2, 2011.

Plot 
In the plot, the audience will follow the stories of the residents and visitors of the small town of Ribeirão do Tempo, such as Eleonora Durrel, Arminda, Joca, Tito, Karina, Filomena and Querencio, among others.

Already in the beginning, several events transform the life of the inhabitants of Ribeirão, city that counts on a beautiful nature besides having a historical center.

Calm and tranquility give way to hectic days. On one side is the multinational presided over by Madame Durrel, who invests heavily in the city. On the other, there are radical sports, which invade the day-to-day life of the place and attract tourists from all over. To complete, a series of barbaric crimes terrorize all, without anyone being able to arrest the criminals or to understand the reason of that.

Cast

Main cast

Special participations

Supporting cast

References

External links
  
 

2010 telenovelas
Brazilian telenovelas
2010 Brazilian television series debuts
2011 Brazilian television series endings
RecordTV telenovelas
Portuguese-language telenovelas